Nobuo Ariga (14 October 1964 – 27 February 2023), also known as Hiroo Ariga ( in his early years of career, was a Japanese singer-songwriter, bassist, arranger and record producer.

Life and career 
Born in Tokyo, while studying at the Nihon University College of Art, Ariga co-founded the band , in which he performed as a bassist. After the band disbanded,  he was part of the Shinji Harada's supporting band Crisis. In 1987, he made his debut as singer-songwriter, with the single "Ameiro no Boku to Kimi". He also worked as a producer and arranger, collaborating among others with  Hiroko Yakushimaru, Fumiya Fujii, and Misato Watanabe. In 2020, after collaborating with the band as a producer since 2007, he joined the group  as a bassist. 
 
Diagnosed with end-stage prostate cancer in the summer of 2022, Ariga died on 27 February 2023, at the age of 58.

Discography
Albums

 1987 - Sherbet 	(32FD-1059)
 1992 - umbrella 	(FHCF-2005) 
 1993 - Innocent Days (FHCF-2101）
 2006 - GOLDEN☆BEST (BVCK-38117）

References

External links
 
 

1964 births
2023 deaths
Musicians from Tokyo
Japanese singer-songwriters
Japanese male singers
Japanese bass guitarists
Japanese record producers
Nihon University alumni